Koritnik is a village in the municipality of Ivanjica, Serbia. According to the 2011 census, the village has a population of 394 inhabitants.

Population

References

Populated places in Moravica District